Lee Ho-joon may refer to:
 Lee Ho-joon (baseball)
 Lee Ho-joon (swimmer)
 Ri Ho-jun, North Korean sports shooter